Justi Michelle Baumgardt-Yamada (born July 22, 1975) is a retired American soccer midfielder who was a member of the United States women's national soccer team.

International career statistics

References

External links
W-League player profile
WUSA player profile
Crossfire Premier youth soccer coaching profile

1975 births
Living people
Parade High School All-Americans (girls' soccer)
Portland Pilots women's soccer players
Sportspeople from Renton, Washington
New York Power players
Washington Freedom players
American women's soccer players
United States women's international soccer players
Women's association football midfielders
California Storm players
Soccer players from Washington (state)
Seattle Sounders Women players
USL W-League (1995–2015) players
Women's United Soccer Association players
Women's Premier Soccer League players